Chrysochroa fulminans is the type species of jewel beetle in its genus; it belongs to the family Buprestidae, tribe Chrysochroini and subgenus Chrysochroa.

Description
These beetles have a glossy surface with iridescent colors varying from green to reddish or violet.

List of subspecies
 Chrysochroa fulminans agusanensis Kurosawa, 1979
 Chrysochroa fulminans aurora Heller, 1912
 Chrysochroa fulminans babuyanensis Kurosawa, 1989
 Chrysochroa fulminans baliana Obenberger, 1928
 Chrysochroa fulminans bimanensis Lansberge, 1879
 Chrysochroa fulminans chrysura Gory, 1840
 Chrysochroa fulminans chrysuroides Deyrolle, 1864
 Chrysochroa fulminans cyaneonigra Kurosawa, 1991
 Chrysochroa fulminans florensis Kerremans, 1891
 Chrysochroa fulminans fulminans (Fabricius, 1787)
 Chrysochroa fulminans funebris Théry, 1898
 Chrysochroa fulminans kaupii Deyrolle, 1864
 Chrysochroa fulminans krausei Descarpentries, 1971
 Chrysochroa fulminans nagaii Kurosawa, 1990
 Chrysochroa fulminans nishiyamai Kurosawa, 1990
 Chrysochroa fulminans nylanderiHołyński, 2009
 Chrysochroa fulminans praelonga White, 1843
 Chrysochroa fulminans variabilis Deyrolle, 1864
 Chrysochroa fulminans vethiana Obenberger, 1926

Distribution
These beetles can be found from Malaysia, Indonesia, the Philippines, to Papua New Guinea.

References

External links

Buprestidae
Beetles described in 1787